Sargam is a 1992 Indian Malayalam-language musical drama film written and directed by Hariharan and produced by his wife Bhavani Hariharan. Chowallur Krishnankutty wrote the dialogues. The film features Vineeth, Manoj K. Jayan, and Rambha (in her Malayalam film debut), while Nedumudi Venu, Soumini/Srikanya, Urmila Unni, V. K. Sriraman, Thilakan, and Oduvil Unnikrishnan play supporting roles. Shaji N. Karun did the cinematography, while Bombay Ravi composed the soundtrack and M. S. Mani handled the editing. This movie was a blockbuster and 3rd highest grossing movie of the year. The film won the National Film Award for Best Popular Film Providing Wholesome Entertainment and three Kerala State Film Awards: Best Director (Hariharan), Second Best Actor (Manoj K. Jayan), and Best Music Director (Bombay Ravi). It was remade in Telugu as Sarigamalu with Vineeth, Manoj K. Jayan, and Rambha reprising their roles.

Plot
Kuttan Thampuran is the son of Subhadra Thampuratti and Kochanyian Thampuran of the Maangaattu Kovilakam. Kuttan has suffered from epilepsy since his childhood. He is rough and violent in his character and is feared by all in the village. Haridas is his classmate despite being two years younger and develops a special bond with Kuttan from childhood. Hari always accompanies Kuttan and carries iron keys to assist him in case the seizure develops. Both Hari and Kuttan grow up to be unsuccessful in their respective lives, and Hari is criticized for this by his father Bhagavathar, who is a well-known classical singer but has himself not been financially successful. Hari has had a liking for music, but Bhagavathar discourages him from music and persuades him into a professional degree course. Kuttan, meanwhile, had frequent epileptic seizures and is a nuisance in both his home and the village, despite seeking various medical treatments.

Unknown to Bhagavathar, Hari has a natural talent as a singer and has abundant raw talent, which he displays at the local temple. Thankamani, who is dependent on Illam, is a student of Bhagavathar and falls for Hari after she hears him singing. Hari, though initially reluctant towards Thankamani, soon develops a passionate relationship with her based on the mutual interest in music. Kuttan discloses to Hari that he is the only person who loves him, and they reaffirm their brotherly love for each other. Meanwhile, Thekkemadom Nampoothiri advises that the only treatment for Kuttan is to get married. Both Valiya Thampuran and Thampuratti plan to get Thankamani as a wife for Kuttan. Kuttan agrees to this, unbeknownst about the affair between Hari and Thankamani, and Thampuratti persuades Hari to forget Thankamani and leave the village for Kuttan's sake. Kuttan is devastated after coming to know about everything after their marriage and commits suicide.

Years later, an aging Thampuratti calls for Hari, who has grown up to be a well-known singer in India, to pay a visit to her. Hari's visit to the village and subsequent happenings form the rest of the story. Meanwhile, Thankamani is paralyzed and unable to speak probably from the shock of her forced marriage and then the subsequent suicide of her husband Kuttan.

When Hari sings "Raga Sudha Rasa.." for Thampuratti, then hearing his voice, Thankamani attempts to sing along. Soon, she displays signs of getting cured, and now, Thampuratti passes on, relieved that Thankamani can be reunited with Hari.

Cast

 Vineeth as Haridas
 Manoj K. Jayan as Kuttan Thampuran
 Rambha as Thankamani (credited as Amrutha)
 Soumini as Nandini
 Urmila Unni as Subhadra Thampurati, Kuttan's mother
 V. K. Sriraman as Kochanyian Thampuran, Kuttan's father
 Nedumudi Venu as Bhagavathar, Haridas's father
 Thilakan as Thekkemadom Nampoothiri
 Oduvil Unnikrishnan as Valiya Thampuran
 Renuka as Kunjulakshmi
 Santhakumari as Thankamani's mother
 Ravi Vallathol as Kunjulakshmi's husband
 Jagannatha Varma as Warrier Master
 B.Harikumar as Sheshadri
 Anila Sreekumar as Maid
 Mariza as Mariza
 Samyuktha Varma as Nandhini M. (uncredited role)

Soundtrack

The acclaimed soundtrack of this movie was composed by Bombay Ravi, for which the lyrics were penned by Yusufali Kechery and also selections from traditionals.

Awards
National Film Awards
 Best Popular Film Providing Wholesome Entertainment

Kerala State Film Awards
 Best Director - Hariharan
 Second Best Actor - Manoj K. Jayan
 Best Music Director - Bombay Ravi

Filmfare Awards South
Filmfare Award for Best Film - Malayalam - Bhavani Jayakumar

References

External links

1992 films
1990s Malayalam-language films
Films directed by Hariharan
Malayalam films remade in other languages
Films scored by Ravi
1990s musical drama films
Indian musical drama films
Films about classical music and musicians
Films shot in Kozhikode
Films whose editor won the Best Film Editing National Award
Best Popular Film Providing Wholesome Entertainment National Film Award winners
1992 drama films